Obermosel-Zeitung was a newspaper published in Luxembourg between 1881 and 1948. In 1948, it merged into the Lëtzebuerger Journal.

Defunct newspapers published in Luxembourg
German-language newspapers published in Luxembourg
1881 in Luxembourg
1948 in Luxembourg